Dance Dance Revolution Ultramix 2, or simply Ultramix 2, is a music rhythm video game released on November 18, 2004 by Konami in American markets for the Microsoft Xbox.

Gameplay

Music
Ultramix 2 has a unique songlist compared to previous releases on other console systems. Rather than focusing on songs pulled from specific arcade versions, there is more emphasis on completely new material. This is also the first DDR release to feature licenses from A Different Drum records, a trend that would continue on throughout the Ultramix and DDR Universe series, as well as the arcade release of Dance Dance Revolution X. This is also the second DDR game to utilize downloadable content after its predecessor, allowing users to download song packs off of Xbox Live.

A large portion of the new songs were ported over to the Japanese PlayStation 2 release, Dance Dance Revolution Strike.

Downloadable content

Music sampler

Dance Dance Revolution Ultramix 2 Limited Edition Music Sampler is a bonus music CD featuring songs from the game. These samplers are available only to those who reserve the game before its release, typically at a GameStop or EB Games retail outlet. The CD contains tracks taken directly from the game as well as unique remixes done by Konami's in-house artists from a broad range of musical styles.

Known to Konami as V-RARE SOUNDTRACK-4 USA, the V-RARE moniker had first been used by Konami to release similar albums in Japan to commemorate Bemani game releases there and still are to this date are. In Japan the music CDs are usually bundled with a given game upon release. To date Konami has released 13 V-RARE discs  in the US to promote various Dance Dance Revolution game releases and has released them through various video game and non-video game vendors such as GameStop, EB Games, Toys "R" Us, and Burger King.

Of the tracks that comprise this CD the more notable ones are MAX 300 (Super-Max-Me Mix) a remix of MAX 300 from the Japanese DDRMAX arcade and is also one song of many that marks the first time Konami has allowed outside talent to remix their in-house music, and In My Eyes (Midihead Remix) which introduces Bemani fans to Midihead, an artist that also goes by the name Monolithic and has been well received by DDR fans for his unique vocals and song structure.

Reception

Promotions

References

External links
Dance Dance Revolution Ultramix 2 official website

2004 video games
Dance Dance Revolution games
Multiplayer online games
Video games scored by Jesper Kyd
Video games developed in the United States
Xbox-only games
Xbox games